This article concerns the period 589 BC – 580 BC.

Events and trends
589 BC—Apries succeeds Psamtik II as king of Egypt.
589 BC—Nebuchadnezzar II begins his siege of Jerusalem.
589 BC—Battle of An: Jin defeats Qi; these two Chinese states later agree to an alliance.
588 BC—January 15: the last phase of Siege of Jerusalem began.
587/586 BC—Jerusalem falls to the Babylonians, ending the Kingdom of Judah. The conquerors destroy the Jewish Temple of Jerusalem and exile some of the land's inhabitants.
586 BC—Death of King Ding of the Zhou Dynasty of China.
28 May 585 BC—A solar eclipse occurs, as predicted by Thales of Miletus, while Alyattes of Lydia fights Cyaxares of Media at a battle on the Halys river, leading to a truce. This is a cardinal date from which other dates can be calculated.
585 BC—Kirrha is destroyed, ending the First Sacred War.
585 BC—Lucius Tarquinius Priscus, king of Rome, defeats the Sabines in war, takes the town of Collatia, and celebrates a triumph for his victories on 13 September.
585 BC—Ji Yi becomes King Jian of the Zhou Dynasty of China.
585 BC—Fall of the Kingdom of Urartu following a Median invasion. (The Scythians ruined the Kingdom of Urartu.)
585 BC—Croesus succeeds Alyattes as King of Lydia.
585/584 BC—Astyages succeeds Cyaxares as King of the Medes.
582 BC—Military clash of the major Classical antiquity powers Egypt and Babylon.
582 BC—Akragas is founded on Sicily.
582 BC—Nebuchadnezzar forces a third deportation of Jews from Judah into Babylonian captivity.
582 BC—The Pythian Games are reorganised at Delphi (traditional date).
582/581 BC—The Isthmian Games are founded at Corinth.
581 BC—Suizei becomes the second Emperor of Japan.
c. 580 BC—Cambyses I succeeds Cyrus I as king of Anshan and head of the Achaemenid dynasty.
c. 580 BC—Gorgon Medusa, detail of sculpture from the west pediment of the Temple of Artemis, Korkyra, is made.
c. 580 BC—Standing Youth (kouros) is made.

Significant people
585 BC—Birth of Anaximenes of Miletus, Greek philosopher (died 525 BC)
585 BC—Death of Emperor Jimmu of Japan (according to legend)
585 BC—Death of king Cyaxares of Media
585 BC—Death of king Alyattes of Lydia
580 BC—Death of Cyrus I of Anshan (approximate date)

References